Abel Minard (September 25, 1814 - January 31, 1871) was an American industrialist and entrepreneur.

Abel Minard was the son of Abel Minard, a glass blower from Sandlake, NY. 

1814 births
1871 deaths
American industrialists
19th-century American businesspeople